The 7th Central American and Caribbean Junior Championships was held in Mexico City, Mexico, on 26–29 June 1986.  Results were affected by altitude.

Medal summary
Medal winners are published by category: Junior A, Male, Junior A, Female, and Junior B. 
Complete results can be found on the World Junior Athletics History website.

Male Junior A (under 20)

Female Junior A (under 20)

Male Junior B (under 17)

Female Junior B (under 17)

Medal table (unofficial)

Participation (unofficial)

Belize competed for the first time at the championships. Detailed result lists can be found on the World Junior Athletics History website.  An unofficial count yields a number of about 262 athletes (154 junior (under-20) and 108 youth (under-17)) from about 12 countries:

 (22)
 (8)
 (1)
 (2)
 (4)
 (51)
 (3)
 México (88)
 (5)
 Panamá (1)
 (45)
 (32)

References

External links
Official CACAC Website
World Junior Athletics History

Central American and Caribbean Junior Championships in Athletics
International athletics competitions hosted by Mexico
1986 in Mexican sports
Central American and Caribbean Junior Championships
1986 in youth sport